Jean-Thenistor Pascal (born 28 October 1982) is a Haitian-born Canadian professional boxer. He held the WBA (Regular) light-heavyweight title from 2019 to 2021, and previously the WBC, IBO, Ring magazine and lineal light-heavyweight titles between 2009 and 2011, and challenged once for the WBC super-middleweight title in 2008.

Early life and amateur career
Pascal was born in Port-au-Prince, Haiti. When Pascal was four, his mother (a nurse) and older brother (Nicholson Poulard) had left Haiti and settled in Laval, Quebec, just outside Montreal. His father, a well-respected politician, remained in Haiti. Pascal played hockey and soccer, but after watching his older brother become the Quebec Boxing Champion in 1996, Pascal, at 13 years of age, started to visit boxing gym "Club Champions St-Michel" once or twice every week. His first trainer was Sylvain Gagnon, who considered Pascal to be very talented. According to an interview from May 2005, Pascal's idol was Roy Jones Jr.

He represented Canada as a middleweight at the 2004 Olympics in Athens and won the gold medal at the Commonwealth Games in Manchester in 2002, against Paul Smith.

Professional career

Super-middleweight

Early years
Pascal made his professional debut in February 2005. After nine wins, Pascal won the Canada National and Quebec boxing Council (CQB) super-middleweight titles in a national bout against Martin Desjardins, winning in round seven. After two more fights, Pascal won the TAB (Trans America Boxing) title against Darnell Boone. Pascal boxed Lucas Green Arias in September 2006 at the Montreal Casino for the vacant WBC Latino title. Pascal sent Arias to the canvas with a flurry of punches in the sixth round. Arias got up for the final second of the round, but moments later slid off the stool in his corner, vigorously rubbing his head. He was unable to get up for the seventh round, making Pascal the winner. He was given oxygen in the ring and then was taken to the hospital on a stretcher. It was revealed that he suffered a subdural hematoma.

On 18 November 2006, Pascal defeated Jermain Mackey by unanimous decision to win the NABO super-middleweight title. Pascal then defeated Lafarrell Bunteng by unanimous decision on 10 March 2007, defending the NABO belt.

Pascal defeated Christian Cruz by technical knockout in the tenth round to retain his NABO title and win the vacant NABA and NABF titles. This win solidified his reputation at the national level.

Pascal successfully defended the NABO/NABF/NABA super-middleweight titles with a ten-round unanimous decision over Brian Norman in December 2007.

Pascal  vs. Froch

At 21-0, Pascal got his first world title shot when he was matched against British boxer Carl Froch for the vacant WBC super middleweight title on 6 December 2008 at the Trent FM Arena in Froch's hometown of Nottingham, England. Pascal held his own, with both men consistently tagging each other throughout the bout. However, Froch won a hard-fought, exciting contest which had many close rounds by a unanimous decision. The scorecards read 112-116, 111-117 and 110-118. Since the bout, Froch and Pascal have become friends on a personal level and have made a promise to face each other again in the future.

After the loss, Pascal fought Pablo Daniel Zamora Nievas on 4 April 2009 and won the fight by knockout in the fifth round to win the vacant WBO Inter-Continental super-middleweight title.

Light-heavyweight
Pascal then moved up in weight to the light-heavyweight division to challenge the WBC light-heavyweight champion Adrian Diaconu on 19 June 2009 at the Bell Centre in Montreal. Pascal won the bout and the title by a unanimous decision. About two months after the fight on 12 August 2009 the city of Laval honored Pascal.

Pascal defended his WBC light-heavyweight title for the first time on 25 September 2009 against the WBC's mandatory challenger, aged Italian veteran Silvio Branco, retaining his title with a tenth round stoppage.

Pascal's second title defense came on 11 December 2009 in a rematch against Adrian Diaconu. Just like the first fight against Diaconu, the fight ended in another win by decision. Throughout the fight Pascal seemed to be having problems with his right arm, starting around round five. However it did appear that his cutman, Russ Anber, was able to pop the shoulder back in before the start of round eleven. Five days after the fight on 16 December 2009 Pascal underwent arthroscopic surgery for his right shoulder. Doctors removed a bone chip and repaired the labrum in his shoulder.

In June 2010, Pascal re-signed a multi-million dollar contract with promoter Groupe Yvon Michel in which he was guaranteed $1,050,000 to defend his title against Chad Dawson, as well as another $1,500,000 guaranteed in the fight following Dawson, which happened to be Bernard Hopkins. The contract is the most lucrative ever given out to a boxer in Quebec boxing history. Pascal has become the first Canadian boxer to receive more than a million dollars for a fight in Canada.

Pascal vs. Dawson
For Pascal's third title defense, he fought Chad Dawson for Pascal's WBC light-heavyweight title, and the vacant Lineal & The Ring light-heavyweight titles. Pascal dominated the early action and worked well in the middle rounds but seemed to tire late and get frequently caught by the favored Dawson. Pascal won the fight by a technical decision part way through the eleventh round due to an accidental head butt that caused a major cut over Dawson's right eye and was stopped by the ring-side doctor. However Pascal easily won the fight according to the judges' scorecards with scores of 108–101 and 106–103.

Pascal vs. Hopkins I, II 

Following Pascal's upset of Chad Dawson, 45-year-old Bernard Hopkins was soon named his next opponent for him to defend his WBC, Lineal, and The Ring light-heavyweight titles. Within the first 48 hours of tickets being on sale for Pascal/Hopkins, more than 15,000 tickets were sold. In preparation for the fight, Pascal spent forty days training in Miami.

The fight took place at the Colisée Pepsi in Quebec City on 18 December 2010. Pascal started strong in the fight, scoring two knockdowns in the first three rounds. One knockdown in the first round, which was disputed by Hopkins as an illegal blow to the back of the head and another knockdown in the third round. However, following the early rounds, the two fighters each held their own, only to have the fight end in a controversial majority draw.

At the end of 2010, The Ring magazine rated Pascal as the 14th best boxer in the world as part of their yearly Top One Hundred Boxers ranking. Pascal moved up fifty-one places on the list, compared to his 2009 ranking of 65. The jump in the rankings was directly attributed to Pascal's upset of Chad Dawson, since the list came out before Pascal fought Bernard Hopkins.

Following the controversial draw with Hopkins in December 2010, Hopkins expressed his frustration. Hopkins, who had refused to fight outside of the United States since 1994, felt there was a judging bias based on the fight being held in Quebec, Canada, as well as a discrimination of his age. Hopkins later criticized Pascal's performance, claiming that Pascal took more damage during the fight and that he clinched frequently. However, when Hopkins was asked about a potential rematch, he replaced most definitely only to claim that he was "too dangerous for anybody" and then went on to complain that GYM promotions was dragging the fight out to make him older so that he would lose.

Pascal defended his performance by noting the two knockdowns he scored early in the fight and defending the legitimacy of the judges. Pascal then expressed that he was unsatisfied with the decision and preferred to have won the fight rather than settle with a draw. When asked about a potential rematch he responded by saying: "If he wants a rematch, anytime."

The rematch with Bernard Hopkins was held on 21 May 2011 at the Bell Centre in Montreal, broadcast on HBO World Championship Boxing.

The bout began with both fighters feeling each other out for the first few rounds. In the third round, Hopkins began to find success with the right hand and shook the knees of Pascal. In the fourth round, both fighters exchanged power shots frantically with Hopkins looking slightly wobbled at the end of the round. Later on, before the seventh round began, Hopkins began doing push-ups in the ring. In the ninth round, Pascal's glove touched the mat after a cupping shot and was ruled a slip. This occurred again in the tenth. The fight concluded with the judges scoring the bout, 112-116, 114-115 and 113-115 in favor of Hopkins.

Pascal vs. Kuziemski, Bute 
After many months under the radar, Pascal was slated to fight Tavoris Cloud for the IBF light-heavyweight title on 11 August 2012, but a hand injury forced him to pull out of the fight. Pascal finally returned to the ring on 14 December 2012 against Aleksy Kuziemski. He won the fight via wide unanimous decision, receiving the scores: 100-88, 98-88 and 98-90, from the fights' judges.
It was announced that Jean Pascal would be fighting Lucian Bute on 25 May 2013, at the Bell Centre in Montreal, Quebec for Bute's NABF light heavyweight title and the vacant WBC Diamond championship. The fight was rescheduled for 18 January 2014 due to an injury that required surgery to remove bone fragments from Bute's left hand. Pascal ended up winning the fight by unanimous decision.

Pascal vs. Kovalev I, Gonzalez 
It was announced on 23 December 2014 that unified world champion Sergey Kovalev would defend his titles and fight Pascal on 14 March 2015 for the WBA, IBF and WBO world light heavyweight titles at the Bell Centre in Montreal, Quebec, Canada live on HBO. Kovalev had just been named Sports Illustrated's 2014 Fighter of the Year. Kovalev started the fight off aggressively as usual and took control of the fight earlier and eventually knocked Pascal down in the 3rd round. Pascal began to fight back and showed some signs of life in rounds 5 and 6, although Kovalev gained control of the fight again and began to hit Pascal with huge shots, wobbling him and in the 8th round the referee stopped the fight as he felt Pascal had taken too much punishment. Pascal felt the stoppage was unfair and demanded for a rematch. At the time of stoppage, Kovalev was leading 68-64 on all three judges' scorecards. CompuBox stats showed Kovalev landed 122 of 471 punches (26%) and Pascal connected on 68 of 200 (34%). The fight averaged 1.152 million viewers on HBO.

On 29 May, it was announced that Pascal would fight on the Kovalev vs. Mohammedi undercard at the Mandalay Bay Events Center in Nevada on 25 July against undefeated Cuban prospect Yunieski Gonzalez (16-0, 12 KOs). The fight was scheduled for 10 rounds. Gonzalez took the fight to Pascal in an entertaining affair that went the full 10 round distance. He was cheered on by the fans and HBO also praised his performance, as he was looking to make a statement in the light heavyweight division. Gonzalez looked to have outfought and out-landed Pascal, hurting him on a couple of occasions. The three judges' scored the fight an identical 96-94 in favour of Pascal. Many observers ringside had Gonzalez winning, some with a wide margin. HBO's unofficial scorekeeper Harold Lederman scored the fight 97-93 for Gonzalez. ESPN had the fight wider at 98-92 for Gonzalez. Gonzalez cried in the ring after losing the bout, feeling he had won. The win helped Pascal earn a rematch with Kovalev. CompuBox stats shows that Gonzalez landed 163 of 632 punches thrown (26%), while Pascal was the more accurate puncher landing 154 of his 397 thrown (39%).

Pascal vs. Kovalev II 
On 5 December 2015 it was announced that the rematch between Kovalev and Pascal was set, to take place on 30 January 2016 at the Bell Centre in Montreal on HBO. Pascal was pumped for the rematch stating it would turn out differently to the first fight, "I put him down in the eighth round in the first fight, but [the referee] called it a slip. But I promise you that Kovalev is going to have a full plate in the rematch. I'm going to have a full plate as well, but I have a new trainer [Hall of Famer Freddie Roach]. I'm going to teach him respect and to respect Canadian boxing fans."

In front of 9,866, Kovalev dominated the fight, both outpunching and outlanding Pascal by wide margins. Kovalev won when Pascal's trainer Freddie Roach refused to let his fighter continue after the seventh round. At the time of stoppage, the scorecards read 70-62 three times, in favour of Kovalev. Round 5 was scored 10-8 on all three judges cards without there having been a knockdown. Kovalev landed 31 of 73 punches in round 5 alone. After the round, Roach threatened to pull Pascal. According to compubox stats, Kovalev landed 165 of 412 punches (40%) and Pascal landed 30 of 108 blows (28%).

Pascal vs. Ramallo
Pascal announced he would fight on 16 December 2016 against 33 year old journeyman Ricardo Marcelo Ramallo at the Cogeco Amphitheater in Trois-Rivières. Ramallo challenged for the vacant IBO International super middleweight title in 2015 in a losing attempt to Renold Quinlan. The fight took place at light heavyweight with Pascal weighing just over 181 pounds. Pascal stopped Ramallo in the 3rd round of their scheduled 10 round fight. In the opening rounds, Ramalo was connecting with his own shots from time to time, but did not have the same size, speed or the power of Pascal to do any further damage. Pascal knocked Ramallo down twice in the round 3 with the right hands to the head. Ramallo was hurt after the second knockdown. Although he seemed to have recovered, the referee stopped the fight rather than letting it go on.

Pascal vs. Álvarez 
On 15 April 2017 it was announced that Pascal could fight Colombian Eleider Álvarez (22-0, 11 KOs) for the WBC Silver light heavyweight title on the undercard of Stevenson's world title defense against Fonfara at the Centre Bell in Montreal, Quebec, Canada on 3 June 2017. Álvarez was due to fight Stevenson next for the WBC world title, but took money to step aside. The event was scheduled to be shown live on Showtime and was confirmed on 21 April. Álvarez outboxed Pascal, winning a majority decision after 12 rounds. One judge scored the fight 114-114, whilst the other two scored it 117-111 and 116-112 in favour of Álvarez. Pascal suffered his third defeat in five fights. Álvarez controlled the fight with his superior jab, accuracy and general ring work. Pascal felt he had done enough to get the win and wanted a rematch with Álvarez.

Pascal vs. Elbiali 
On 30 October 2017 Warriors Boxing Promotions announced a Friday night boxing card presented by Premier Boxing Champions would take place 8 December at the Hialeah Park in Miami, Florida. It was confirmed that Pascal would main event the card against Egyptian contender Ahmed Elbiali (16-0, 13 KOs), with former world champion Chad Dawson appearing as chief support, however he pulled out of his fight. Pascal told Ringtv it would be his final fight. Pascal retired with a stoppage win in round 6. Elbiali had begun to fade and looked exhausted by round 6. Pascal landed a flurry of shots trapping Elbiali against the ropes. Referee Telis Assimenios then intervened after the towel was thrown in. The time of stoppage was 2 minutes and 6 seconds of the sixth round.

Cruiserweight

Pascal vs. Bossé 
The Montreal Journal and TVA Sports reported on 7 May 2018 that Pascal, despite announcing his retirement in 2017, would return to the ring on the  Adonis Stevenson vs. Badou Jack undercard on 19 May in Toronto. His trainer Stephan Larouche later confirmed Pascal would fight again on 29 June. On 9 May, it was announced that Pascal would fight 36 year old former mixed martial arts fighter and hockey enforcer Steve Bossé on 29 June 2018. The fight was postponed to take place on 20 July. Pascal weighed 193 pounds for the fight. In front of around 3,300 fans, Pascal dominated and stopped Bossé in round 8 of their scheduled 10 round bout. The win meant for the first time in 12 years, dating back to 2006 that Pascal recorded back-to-back stoppage wins. Bossé tried to apply pressure on Pascal but was dropped once in round 3. Pascal continued to land heavy shots eventually dropping Bosse down a second time in round 8. The referee decided to stop the fight. It was reported that Bossé had suffered an injury during training on his right bicep and also suffered a broken jaw during the fight. Pascal stated he would continue boxing as he had "other goals to achieve", however did not state if he would continue to fight at cruiserweight or drop back down to light heavyweight.

Return to light-heavyweight

Pascal vs. Bivol 
On 23 September, Groupe Yvon Michel announced that he had reached a deal for Pascal to fight Canadian cruiserweight champion Gary Kopas (10-11-2, 5 KOs) in Sydney, Nova Scotia on 9 November 2018 in a 12 round bout. The fight with Kopas was cancelled in early October after Sainvoyis Pascal, Jean's father, suffered a heart attack and died. Pascal needed time to attend the funeral. On 16 October, it was reported that Pascal was on the verge of returning to light heavyweight to challenge WBA champion Dmitry Bivol (14-0, 11 KOs) at the Etess Arena in Atlantic City on 24 November 2018. Bivol was initially in talks to make a defence against Joe Smith Jr., however Smith accepted a fight against IBF champion Artur Beterbiev in December instead. Later that same day, the fight was confirmed and would be televised by HBO. Pascal lost by wide unanimous decision, with the judges scoring the bout 119-109, 119-109, 117-111 in favor of Bivol.

Pascal vs. Browne 
On 3 August 2019, Pascal faced undefeated Marcus Browne at the Barclays Center in New York. Although Browne won the majority of the rounds, Pascal knocked Browne down a total of three times in the fight, once in the fourth round and twice in the seventh round. This gave Pascal a lead of 75-74 on all three judges' scorecards at the time of the stoppage in the middle of the eighth round, when the fight was halted due to a clash of heads. As a result, Pascal emerged victorious via unanimous technical decision, and became the new WBA interim light-heavyweight champion.

Pascal vs. Jack 
Pascal put his WBA (Regular) light-heavyweight title on the line when he faced former two-division world champion Badou Jack on 28 December 2019 at State Farm Arena in Atlanta on the undercard of Gervonta Davis vs. Yuriorkis Gamboa. Jack was ranked #6 by the WBC and #11 by the WBA at light heavyweight. In what was a competitive, hard-fought fight, Pascal had the better start, winning the majority of the opening rounds and scoring a knockdown with a right hook in the fourth round. However, Jack found his way back into the fight, using his jab and body punches to render damage to his opponent and win rounds. In the final round, Jack returned the favor and dropped Pascal to the canvas with a overhand right and a flurry of right hooks. Despite Jack's success in the later stages of the fight, Pascal was deemed the winner by somewhat controversial split decision, with scores of 114-112, 114-112 in favor of Pascal, and 114-112 in favor of Jack. According to CompuBox, Pascal landed 155 of 556 punches thrown (28%) while Jack landed 244 of 632 punches thrown (39%).

Canceled Pascal vs. Jack rematch 
Pascal and Badou Jack had originally been scheduled to face each other in a rematch of their 2019 fight on the undercard of Floyd Mayweather Jr. vs. Logan Paul on 6 June 2021, but the rematch was canceled when it emerged on 28 May that Pascal had failed random Voluntary Anti-Doping Association-administered tests and had tested positive for three different banned PEDs: drostanolone, drostanolone metabolite and epitrenbolone. Pascal responded to the news, saying that he was "shocked and embarrassed". On 3 June, reports surfaced that Pascal had failed yet another drugs test, testing positive for a fourth banned substance, erythropoietin, also known as EPO.

Professional boxing record

See also
List of world light-heavyweight boxing champions

References

External links

Jean Pascal profile at Cyber Boxing Zone
Jean Pascal - Profile, News Archive & Current Rankings at Box.Live

|-

|-

|-

|-

|-

|-

|-

|-

1982 births
Living people
Canadian male boxers
Sportspeople from Port-au-Prince
Haitian emigrants to Canada
Canadian sportspeople of Haitian descent
Haitian Quebecers
Sportspeople from Laval, Quebec
Black Canadian boxers
Commonwealth Games gold medallists for Canada
Boxers at the 2002 Commonwealth Games
Commonwealth Games medallists in boxing
Medallists at the 2002 Commonwealth Games
Boxers at the 2003 Pan American Games
Pan American Games bronze medalists for Canada
Medalists at the 2003 Pan American Games
Pan American Games medalists in boxing
Olympic boxers of Canada
Boxers at the 2004 Summer Olympics
Doping cases in boxing
Canadian sportspeople in doping cases
Haitian male boxers
Light-middleweight boxers
Middleweight boxers
Super-middleweight boxers
World Boxing Council champions
The Ring (magazine) champions
International Boxing Organization champions
World Boxing Association champions
World light-heavyweight boxing champions